Morocco competed at the 2022 Mediterranean Games in Oran, Algeria over 10 days from 25 June to 6 July 2022 with delegation of 137 athletes in 15 sports.

Medals

Medal table

Equestrian

Morocco competed in equestrian.

Football

Men's tournament

Standings
Results

Group A

Semifinals

Bronze medal match

Shooting

Morocco competed in shooting.

References 

Nations at the 2022 Mediterranean Games
2022
Mediterranean Games